1466 Mündleria, provisional designation , is a carbonaceous asteroid from the inner regions of the asteroid belt, approximately 22 kilometers in diameter.

It was discovered on 31 May 1938, by German astronomer Karl Reinmuth at Heidelberg Observatory in southern Germany, and later named after German astronomer Max Mündler.

Orbit and classification 

Mündleria orbits the Sun in the inner main-belt at a distance of 2.0–2.7 AU once every 3 years and 8 months (1,339 days). Its orbit has an eccentricity of 0.16 and an inclination of 13° with respect to the ecliptic. Mündlerias observation arc begins with its official discovery observation in 1938.

Physical characteristics 

The asteroid has been characterized as a carbonaceous C-type asteroid.

Diameter and albedo 

According to the surveys carried out by the Japanese Akari satellite and NASA's Wide-field Infrared Survey Explorer with its subsequent NEOWISE mission, Mündleria measures between 22.13 and 24.95 kilometers in diameter, and its surface has an albedo between 0.037 and 0.061. The Collaborative Asteroid Lightcurve Link derives an albedo of 0.055 and a diameter of 21.46 kilometers with an absolute magnitude of 12.1.

Lightcurves 

As of 2017, no useful rotational lightcurve of Mündleria has been obtained. The body's rotation period, poles and shape remain unknown.

Naming 

This minor planet was named after German astronomer Max Mündler (1876–1969), staff member at the Heidelberg-Königstuhl State Observatory where the body was discovered. The name was proposed by Heinrich Vogt after whom the minor planet 1439 Vogtia is named. The official naming citation was mentioned in The Names of the Minor Planets by Paul Herget in 1955.

References

External links 
 Asteroid Lightcurve Database (LCDB), query form (info )
 Dictionary of Minor Planet Names, Google books
 Asteroids and comets rotation curves, CdR – Observatoire de Genève, Raoul Behrend
 Discovery Circumstances: Numbered Minor Planets (1)-(5000) – Minor Planet Center
 
 

001466
Discoveries by Karl Wilhelm Reinmuth
Named minor planets
19380531